Gyeongguksa is a Buddhist temple of the Jogye Order in Seoul, South Korea. Founded in 1325 it is located in 753 Jeongneung-dong, in the Seongbuk-gu area of the city.

See also
List of Buddhist temples in Seoul

External links
www.encyber.com

Buddhist temples in Seoul
Jongno District
Buddhist temples of the Jogye Order
1325 establishments in Asia